Joel is a surname. Notable people with the surname include:

 Joel family, a British family of brothers who became rich from diamond and gold mining in South Africa
 Alex Joel, first American Civil Liberties Protection Officer for the U.S. Office of the Director of National Intelligence
 Alexa Ray Joel (born 1985), American singer-songwriter and daughter of Billy Joel
 Alexander Joel (conductor) (born 1971), British/German pianist and conductor
 Billy Joel (born 1949), American singer-songwriter
 Charlotte Joël (1882/87–1943), German photographer
 Dennis Joel, (born 1947), American former actor and singer
 Diederrick Joel (born 1993), Cameroonian footballer playing in Brazil
 Georg Joel (1898–1981), German Nazi Party official
 Grace Joel (1865–1924), New Zealand artist 
 Karl Joel (philosopher) (1864–1934), German philosopher
 Karl Amson Joel (1889–1982), German Jewish textile merchant and manufacturer
 Lawrence Joel (1928–1984), American Vietnam War medic and Medal of Honor recipient
 Manuel Joël (1826–1890), Silesian Jewish philosopher
 Nicolas Joel (born 1953), French opera director and administrator of opera houses 
 Richard Joel (born 1950), president of Yeshiva University
 Robert Joel (1944–1992), American actor